Allomaieta is a genus of flowering plants belonging to the family Melastomataceae.

Its native range is Colombia.

Species:

Allomaieta caucana 
Allomaieta ebejicosana 
Allomaieta grandiflora 
Allomaieta hirsuta 
Allomaieta javierbarrigae 
Allomaieta pancurana 
Allomaieta strigosa 
Allomaieta villosa 
Allomaieta zenufanasana

References

Melastomataceae
Melastomataceae genera